Dilara Büyükbayraktar (born October 23, 1989) is a Turkish actress, known for the action-mystery film The Scriptwriter (2016) and Sungurlar (2014), as well as the television series Şefkat Tepe.

Büyükbayraktar is a graduate of Anadolu University State Conservatory Theater Department. After graduation, she started to work in private theater in İzmir. The character she portrayed in Şefkat Tepe, Naza, became a popular figure, thus increasing her fan base.

Filmography

References 

Turkish film actresses
Turkish television actresses
1989 births
Living people